The First Valls government was the thirty-seventh government in the Fifth Republic of France. It was led by Manuel Valls, who was appointed prime minister of France on 31 March 2014. It was composed of 15 ministers from the Socialist Party (PS) and two from the Radical Party of the Left (PRG). It was the third cabinet declared by President Hollande and replaced the second Ayrault Cabinet. It was established following the 2014 French municipal elections.

Europe Ecology – The Greens, who had been part of the Ayrault Cabinet, chose not to be part of the cabinet. The Socialist Party, with 290 representatives, and the Radical Party of the Left, with 16 representatives, together have 306 of the 577 representatives in the National Assembly.

The cabinet was smaller than the preceding Ayrault Cabinet, and one of the smallest of the fifth republic, having 16 full ministers as opposed to the 20 in the Ayrault Cabinet.

Valls came from the position as minister of the interior, and 14 other ministers also held positions as ministers or junior ministers in the outgoing Ayrault Cabinet. Nine ministers kept the same ministry (with some change in portfolio for some), including Foreign Minister Laurent Fabius and Minister of Defence Jean-Yves Le Drian.

Two ministers had not been part of the Ayrault Cabinet: Ségolène Royal, who had previously been a minister in the Bérégovoy Cabinet and junior minister in the Jospin Cabinet, and François Rebsamen, who came from the position as leader of the Socialist Party group in the French Senate was included in a cabinet for the first time, becoming minister of labour.

Apart from the prime minister, the cabinet had full gender parity, with eight female and eight male ministers.

The average age of government ministers at the time of appointment was 54, with Laurent Fabius at 67 being the oldest and Najat Vallaud-Belkacem at 36 being the youngest.

On 9 April 2014, fourteen secretaries of states were appointed. They included Fleur Pellerin, who was deputy minister in Ayrault's cabinet, and First Secretary of the French Socialist Party Harlem Désir who both became secretaries to the foreign minister.

Born in Barcelona and becoming a French national in 1982, aged 19, Valls is the first French prime minister during the Fifth Republic who was not born a French citizen.

Prime Minister

Ministers

Secretary of State

Changes

On 3 June 2014, Valérie Fourneyron, Secretary of State for Trade, Crafts, Consumer and Social Economy and Solidarity, resigns for health reasons. She is replaced by Carole Delga.

References

French governments
2014 establishments in France
Cabinets established in 2014
François Hollande
2014 disestablishments in France
Cabinets disestablished in 2014